Smith Branch is a stream in northern Iron County in the U.S. state of Missouri. It is a tributary to Big River within the waters of Council Bluff Lake. It drains the southwest side of Johnson Mountain.

Smith Branch has the name of the local Smith family.

See also
List of rivers of Missouri

References

Rivers of Iron County, Missouri
Rivers of Missouri